Robin Scheu (born 16 February 1995) is a German professional footballer who plays as a right midfielder for  club 1. FC Saarbrücken.

Career 
On 21 June 2021, Scheu signed a two-year contract with 1. FC Saarbrücken.

References

External links
 
 

1995 births
Living people
Sportspeople from Offenbach am Main
German footballers
Footballers from Hesse
Association football midfielders
2. Bundesliga players
3. Liga players
Regionalliga players
Kickers Offenbach players
SC Fortuna Köln players
SV Sandhausen players
1. FC Saarbrücken players